Calosoma flohri is a species of ground beetle in the family Carabidae. It is found in Mexico.

References

Calosoma